The Sheridan Centre Bus Terminal is located in southwestern Mississauga, Ontario, Canada. It is situated on the eastern side of Sheridan Centre.

The terminal does not have a terminal building since it is a minor terminal. It only contains bus shelters and passengers require a short walk to the mall's nearest entrance.

Bus routes
Bus service within the terminal itself is exclusively by MiWay. Route 110 stops at Erin Mills Parkway and Fowler Drive.

Directly serving the terminal 
All routes are wheelchair-accessible.

Indirectly serving the terminal

References

MiWay
Bus stations in Ontario